Lake Iroquois is a lake in South Dakota, in the United States.

Lake Iroquois takes its name from the city of Iroquois, South Dakota.

See also
List of lakes in South Dakota

References

Lakes of South Dakota
Lakes of Kingsbury County, South Dakota